The WB Abu Dhabi, Curio Collection By Hilton is a seven-story hotel in Abu Dhabi to accompany Warner Bros. World Abu Dhabi. The hotel have 156 rooms, and 156 serviced apartments, with all the rooms being themed to Warner Bros. properties like Looney Tunes and DC Comics. The hotel was originally expected to open by 2020, but in December 2019 it was announced that the hotel would open in 2021.

History
The hotel was first reported in November 2018, but official artwork wasn't released until December 2019. On January 16, 2020, Miral Asset Management announced via LinkedIn, "We are pleased to announce that we have recently achieved a significant construction milestone - the topping out of the last concrete for The WB Abu Dhabi Hotel." 

On October 11, 2021, it was revealed that the hotel would be operated by Curio Collection. 

The WB - Abu Dhabi opened its doors on November 11, 2021.

See also
 Warner Bros. World Abu Dhabi
 Cartoon Network Hotel

References

Warner Bros. World Abu Dhabi
Warner Bros.